Hemiphora exserta is a flowering plant in the mint family Lamiaceae and is endemic to the south-west of Western Australia. It is a sprawling shrub with its branches densely covered with white, woolly hairs. Its leaves are rough and wrinkled and the flowers are deep pink or dark red, curved and tube-shaped with spreading petal lobes on the end.

Description
The upper surface is rough and wrinkled with small blisters and the lower surface is covered with short, soft hairs when young.

The sepals are scaly on the outside, linear to lance-shaped and remain attached to the plant after the petals have fallen. The petal tube has soft hairs on the outside but glabrous inside except for a densely hairy ring around the ovary. The five petal lobes form two "lips", the upper lip with two short lobes and the lower with three. The four stamens are about the same length as the petal tube with the lower pair longer than the upper pair.

Taxonomy and naming
This species was first formally described in 1870 by George Bentham who gave it the name Pityrodia uncinata var. exserta. The description was published in Flora Australiensis. In 1979, Ahmad Abid Munir raised the variety to species status as Pityrodia exserta, but in 2011, Barry Conn, Murray Henwood and Nicola Streiber transferred four species, including this one, from the genus Pityrodia into Hemiphora. The specific epithet (exserta) is a Latin word meaning "projecting" or "thrust forward".

Distribution and habitat
Hemiphora exserta is found in the Fitzgerald River National Park in the Esperance Plains biogeographic region where it grows on rocky slopes and undulating plains.

Conservation
Hemiphora exserta is classified as "not threatened" by the Western Australian Government Department of Parks and Wildlife.

References

External links
Instagram image of Hemiphora exserta

exserta
Plants described in 1870
Flora of Western Australia
Taxa named by George Bentham